Joseph Franklin Bent Jr. (November 30, 1927 – May 7, 2004) was a robber who was on the FBI Ten Most Wanted Fugitives list in 1951.

Background
He was also known by the aliases Charles "Hap" Rayborn and Coal Frederick Raymond (among others); the FBI had not tied these names to Bent, a veteran robber, until 16 months after his addition to the Ten Most Wanted list on January 9, 1951. He was added under the charges of robbery, attempted murder, and unlawful flight to avoid prosecution after escaping jail in Gretna, Louisiana.

On March 6, 1946, he enlisted in the United States Army at San Antonio, Texas, but was discharged after less than one month service.

Capture and aftermath
Bent was captured in Texas City, Texas, on August 29, 1952, on the advice of a tip from Alaska that had placed him in Monterrey, Mexico. When two agents attempted to arrest him in his apartment, Bent began to run and appeared to attempt to draw a weapon (he later turned out to be unarmed) and was shot once and wounded in the leg. He was tackled by the agents and eventually apprehended. Bent previously served time at United States Penitentiary, Leavenworth and Alcatraz Federal Penitentiary for his heists. His previous occupations included a fireman, fisherman, railway switch man, and truck driver. He died in 2004 in California.

References

1927 births
2004 deaths
American robbers
Fugitives
People from Clay County, Missouri
United States Army soldiers